Laxmi Narayan Yadav is a socialist leader and former member of parliament (MP) of Bhartiya Janta Party. He has won the 2014 Indian general elections from the Sagar (Lok Sabha constituency). 
He is two times MLA from Surkhi (Vidhan Sabha constituency) assembly seat of Sagar district in Madhya Pradesh.
First time, he was elected in 1977 from Surkhi (Vidhan Sabha constituency) from Janata Party. He has defeated Vitthalbhai Patel who was a Congress leader and Jhooth Bole Kauwa Kaate famed Bollywood lyricist and poet and industrialist. During the same tenure in 1978 – 1980 he served as Minister for Higher Education, in Government of Madhya Pradesh in the Sakhlecha ministry. Mr. Virendra Kumar Sakhlecha was the then chief minister.
Second time, in 1989, Mr. Yadav again defeated Patel from the same constituency.

Personal life
Mr. Yadav was born on Dec. 9, 1944 in Sagar, Madhya Pradesh.
Mr. Yadav married Mrs Gayatri Devi on June 29, 1961.
He has a son Sudheer Yadav who is a member of Bhartiya Janta Party and a daughter. His son Sudheer Yadav (also spelled as Sudhir Yadav) fought assembly elections from Banda (Vidhan Sabha constituency) in Sagar district, Madhya Pradesh from Bharatiya Janshakti Party of Uma Bharti but couldn't succeed. He again fought for assembly in 2018 from Surkhi (Vidhan Sabha constituency) but lost again.

Election results

References

External links
 Laxmi Narayan Yadav, india.gov.in

Living people
India MPs 2014–2019
Lok Sabha members from Madhya Pradesh
People from Sagar district
1944 births
Madhya Pradesh MLAs 1977–1980
Madhya Pradesh MLAs 1990–1992
Bharatiya Janata Party politicians from Madhya Pradesh